Puerto Sur Airport  is an airport serving Isla Santa María, a Pacific island in the Bío Bío Region of Chile.

Northeast approach and departure are over the water.

See also

Transport in Chile
List of airports in Chile

References

External links
OpenStreetMap - Puerto Sur Airport
OurAirports - Puerto Sur Airport
FallingRain - Puerto Sur Airport Airport

Airports in Chile
Airports in Biobío Region